Goodbye Lover is a 1998 neo-noir comedy film about a murder plot surrounding an alcoholic advertising agency worker and his adulterous wife. The film was directed by Roland Joffé, and stars Patricia Arquette, Dermot Mulroney, Don Johnson, Ellen DeGeneres and Mary-Louise Parker. The original script was written by Ron Peer; subsequent drafts were written by Robert Pucci, then Buck Henry.

The film premiered at the 1998 Cannes Film Festival, before being released theatrically in April 1999. Following its premiere, reshoots were done in Beverly Hills, and the climax was changed. This was the last film that Regency Enterprises had teamed up with Warner Bros. before teaming up with 20th Century Fox. until Warner Bros. Pictures released the 2006 romantic-fantasy drama movie The Fountain and only to be released by it.

Plot
Lovely real estate agent Sandra Dunmore, wearing an ugly blonde bob-cut wig, makes a series of flirtatious and sexual calls to her mistress. She then heads to church where she does various community outreach with her brother-in-law Ben, as he plays for the church's choir rehearsals, while they proceed to have sex and discuss their ongoing affair.

Sandra's husband and Ben's much younger brother Jake, an alcoholic, embarrasses himself in his company's meetings with his boss and when flirting with secretary Peggy Blaine, who is also having an affair with Ben. When Ben starts to suspect Sandra of revealing their affair, he drastically attempts to avoid her as he knows her psychotic nature, when they are almost caught having sex in a house Sandra is selling.

Sandra, now even more furious, is stalking and harassing Ben, who is trying to establish a healthy relationship with Peggy. At a dinner party, a hungover Jake tells Ben he suspects something is wrong in his marriage and is considering suicide. Ben dismisses this and suggests he stop drinking. The next morning Jake causes an outburst and tells Ben he is aware of his wife's infidelity and will get revenge regardless.

One night, when Peggy and Ben come home from dinner to go on a second sexual conquest, a drunken Jake angrily calls Ben telling him he knows of the affair and will kill himself if not him. When Ben leaves a now angered Peggy, he goes to his brother's apartment and sees how the place is trashed with his brother sitting on the balcony ledge. Ben fantasizes about pushing him off the balcony to meet his death, but cannot seem to do so correctly. When he steps outside to attempt to kill him, Sandra blinds him with a flashlight which startles him and sends him hanging from the ledge of the balcony. When it is revealed that his lover and brother have betrayed him, Ben is pushed off the ledge to his painful death.

Sandra and Jake lie to Sergeant Rita Pompano and her partner, Rollins. Rita doubts their story, in which a drunken Ben attempted to stop a suicide and consequently killed himself, and begins to investigate around the story, while simultaneously handling a serial killer case. Meanwhile, the couple prepare to collect Ben's $2.5 million insurance policy as he has no other dependents or living relatives aside from his brother. When Rita and Rollins go to inform Ben's boss at the company both he & Jake worked at, Peggy emotionally breaks down and reveals she and Ben secretly married in Las Vegas, making her the rightful heir to Ben's fortune.

This, however, only angers Sandra and Jake, who desperately attempt to retrieve the money. Sandra decides to pin Peggy's death on the serial killer Rollins and Rita are hunting, which turns out to be a hitman who once loved Sandra and is an actual paid hitman who kills his victims using a poison in a needle, fooling the police into believing a serial killer is committing the murders.

However, plans change for Sandra as Jake decides to put the hit out on her instead of Peggy. Sandra eventually discovers that Peggy and Jake have been having an ongoing affair and that Jake actually married Peggy under Ben's name so she can inherit the money and the two can live comfortably in the woods after his wife died, and therefore kills both by wearing a disguise to purchase a getaway car to push them off a cliff road. While the police discover the plot between the couple, they regretfully inform Sandra.

Rita, tired of always being unfairly treated with her retirement plan, decides to blackmail Sandra by arresting her if she doesn't split both Ben and Jake's combined $8 million insurance. Sandra agrees, but unaware of the hit Jake called on her, she is attacked by the hitman. Luckily, Rita recognizes the man from the crime scene and rescues Sandra.

Two months later, both women go to collect their money and enjoy a new life of wealth and luxury, and even Rollins is happy for them. The film's end credits show Sandra unapologetically and cheerfully continuing Ben's duties at the church.

Cast

Reception
Goodbye Lover received negative reviews from critics. It holds a rating of 29% on Rotten Tomatoes based on 34 reviews. The site's consensus states: "Half-baked plot twists disorient rather than build drama."

The film lost money to due its late release and the ending having to be changed which consisted of Sandra getting away with all of the money and Rita dying.

References

External links

1998 films
1990s comedy thriller films
1990s comedy mystery films
American comedy thriller films
American comedy mystery films
1990s English-language films
Films scored by John Ottman
Films directed by Roland Joffé
Films shot in California
German comedy thriller films
American neo-noir films
Regency Enterprises films
Films with screenplays by Joel Cohen
Films with screenplays by Alec Sokolow
Warner Bros. films
1998 comedy films
1990s American films
1990s German films